The Finley Football Club, nicknamed the Cats, is an Australian rules football and netball club based in the town of Finley located in the Riverina district of New South Wales.

The club's football and netball teams currently play in the playing in the Murray FNL, which Finley joined in 1933.

History

The club held an Annual General Meeting in 1895 and entered the Murray Border Football Association, then in 1899 joined the Federal District Football Association
.

Finley FC competed in the Southern Riverina Football Association from 1905 to 1931 and played in 16 grand finals in that period and winning 10 premierships.

Walter Barthelson, a 17 year old Finley footballer from "The Rocks", Tocumwal, New South Wales was injured whilst playing football in 1908 against Leniston and died after an abdominal operation the following day.

In 1915, Finley footballer, Sidney Jones was killed shortly after the outbreak of World War I.

Some players from Finley have risen to the major football league in the country, the Australian Football League (AFL), including – 
Shane Crawford
Tom Hawkins.
Allan Jeans (1955–59, 77 games for St Kilda and premiership coach of St Kilda 1966, premiership coach for Hawthorn 1983, 1986 & 1989), 
Jack Hawkins (1973–81, 182 games- Geelong), 
Darren Jackson and 
Bert Taylor (1934–36, 39 games- Melbourne)

Football competitions timeline
Finley FC have played in the following competitions.
1895 – Murray Border Football Association
1896 – No official competitions?
1897 – No official competitions?
1898 – No official competitions?
1899 & 1900 – Federal Football Association
1901 – In recess. Refused entry into the Federal FA due to excess travel for other clubs.
1902 – No official competitions?
1903 – No official competitions?
1904 – No official competitions?
1905 – No official competitions?
1906 to 1932 – Southern Riverina Football Association
1933 to 2020 – Murray Football League

Premierships
Senior Football
 Southern Riverina Football Association (10):
 1907, 1910, 1914, 1918, 1922, 1923 1926, 1927, 1929, 1930
 Murray Football League (7):
 1952, 1954, 1958, 1971, 1981, 1982, 1988

Runners Up
Senior Football
Southern Riverina Football Association (6)
1909, 1913, 1919, 1920, 1925, 1928.
Murray Football League (11)
 1938, 1950, 1952, 1968, 1972, 1986, 1991, 1993, 2012, 2014, 2016.

VFL / AFL Players
The following footballers, played with Finley prior to playing senior VFL / AFL football, with the year indicating their debut season.
1934: Bert Taylor – Melbourne
1947: Terry Walsh – North Melbourne
1955: Alan Jeans – St. Kilda. Later coached St.Kilda, Hawthorn & Richmond
1958: Jim Broockmann – Fitzroy
1973: Jack Hawkins – Geelong
1973: Michael Hawkins- Geelong
1984: Robb Hawkins – Geelong
1984: Darren Jackson – Geelong
1984: David Murphy - Sydney Swans
1987: Peter Baldwin- Geelong
1990: Damian Sexton – St. Kilda
1993: Shane Crawford – Hawthorn
2000: Marcus Baldwin - Geelong
2007: Tom Hawkins – Geelong
2012: Mark Whiley – Greater Western Sydney & Carlton

Notes

References

External links

 
 Gameday website

Murray Football League clubs
Netball teams in New South Wales
Australian rules football clubs in New South Wales